Tadami Dam is a rock-fill embankment dam on the Tadami River near Tadami in Fukushima Prefecture, Japan. It was constructed between 1981 and 1989 for the purposes of hydroelectric power generation and controlling the outflows of the Tagokura Dam. It supports a 65 MW power station.

See also

Taki Dam – located downstream
Tagokura Dam – located upstream

References

Dams in Fukushima Prefecture
Hydroelectric power stations in Japan
Dams completed in 1989
Dams on the Tadami River
Rock-filled dams
Energy infrastructure completed in 1989
1989 establishments in Japan